Derenik Karapeti Demirchian was a Soviet and Armenian writer, novelist, poet, translator and playwright.

Biography 

Demirchian was born on February 18, 1877, in Akhalkalaki in what is now Javakhk, southern Georgia. After completing his schooling in Tiflis, he became a member of the Armenian literary group Vernatun, so named because its members met in the 5th floor residence of poet Hovhannes Tumanian. Demirchian published his first book of poetry in 1899. He attended the University of Geneva from 1905 to 1909, and then after some years in Tiflis, settled in Yerevan in 1925. During the 1920s several of his plays were produced, most notably Nazar the Brave, a rags to riches comedy about a folkloric figure which is based on a collation of over 60 sources by the poet Tumanian. Described by Demirchian as a play for “childlike adults and adultlike children,” Nazar the Brave was first performed in 1924. It was subsequently given professional productions in Yerevan, Tiflis and Baku, made into an opera and later a film (1940). From the mid-1920s, in addition to writing plays, Demirchian began writing and publishing in other prose genres, including short stories, novels, and children’s stories. His most notable work is Vardanank (parts 1 and 2, 1943–46, 2nd ed., 1951), a monumental patriotic novel dedicated to the 5th century Armenian liberation war. He was also known as a translator from Russian into Armenian; his translation of Nikolai Gogol’s Dead Souls is especially esteemed. Demirchian continued to work and publish until his death in 1956. In 1980, the Derenik Demirchian State literary prize for prose was established in Soviet Armenia. The Derenik Demirchian House-Museum has operated since 1977 in Yerevan, in the house where the writer lived from 1929 to 1956.

He was recognized as a supporter of people's rights. He is the author of "Hayreni yerkir" (1939), "Mesrop Mashtots" (1956) and other books. He was elected to the Academy of Sciences of the Armenian SSR in 1953.

Derenik is buried at Yerevan's Central Cemetery

Vardananq
The novel Vardananq is based on historical events of the 5th century - the Armenian Liberation War, historically known as the "war of Vardanank" (the war of Vardan Mamikonian and his men).

It is written in a bright language that includes historically colorful images of St Vardan's associates, and a realistic picture of the life of Persian and Byzantine ruling circles.

Plays 
Nazar the Brave (Քաջ Նազար), 1912
Vasak, 1914
National Disgrace (Ազգային Խայտառակություն), 1919
Judgement (Դատաստան), 1922
The Song of Victorious Love (Հաղթական Սիրո Երգը), 1927
Phosphoric Ray (Ֆոսֆորային Շող), 1932
Captain (Կապիտան), 1938
Fatherland (Երկիր Հայրենի), 1941
Wealthy Hovhannes (Մեծատուն Հովհաննես)
Napoleon Korkotyan
Comrades (Ընկերները)

References

External links
Demirchyan's biography
Demirchyan's Museum in Yerevan
Demirchyan at Armenianhouse.org
Demirchyan at IMDB

1877 births
1956 deaths
19th-century Armenian poets
19th-century Armenian writers
19th-century male writers
20th-century Armenian poets
20th-century Armenian writers
20th-century male writers
Gevorgian Seminary alumni
Nersisian School alumni
University of Geneva alumni
Recipients of the Order of Lenin
Recipients of the Order of the Red Banner of Labour
Armenian male poets
Armenian male writers
Armenian people from the Russian Empire
Georgian people of Armenian descent
Soviet Armenians
Soviet male poets